The following is an alphabetical list of members of the United States House of Representatives from the Commonwealth of Virginia.  For chronological tables of members of both houses of the United States Congress from the state (through the present day), see United States congressional delegations from Virginia. The list of names should be complete, but other data may be incomplete.

Current representatives 
Representatives of the 118th United States Congress:
 : Rob Wittman (R) (since 2007)
 : Jen Kiggans (R) (since 2023)
 : Bobby Scott (D) (since 1993)
 : Jennifer McClellan (D) (since 2023)
 : Bob Good (R) (since 2021)
 : Ben Cline (R) (since 2019)
 : Abigail Spanberger (D) (since 2019)
 : Don Beyer (D) (since 2015)
 : Morgan Griffith (R) (since 2011)
 : Jennifer Wexton (D) (since 2019)
 : Gerry Connolly (D) (since 2009)

List of members

See also

 List of Confederate representatives from Virginia
 List of United States senators from Virginia
 United States congressional delegations from Virginia
 Virginia's congressional districts

Sources 
 House of Representatives List of Members

Virginia
 
United States representatives